The BT-7  was the last of the BT series of Soviet cavalry tanks that were produced in large numbers between 1935 and 1940. It was lightly armoured, but reasonably well-armed for the time, and had much better mobility than other contemporary tank designs. The BT tanks were known by the nickname Betka from the acronym, or its diminutive, Betushka.

The BT-7's successor was the famous T-34 medium tank, introduced in 1940, which replaced all of the Soviet fast tanks, infantry tanks, and medium tanks then in service.

Development

The first prototypes of the BT-7 had a distinctive canted-ellipse shaped turret mounting both the main gun and a coaxial machine-gun. The specification also called for the project to allow for the installation of new guns without any significant change to the framework: the 76 mm KT-26 or PS-3 main gun (a short-barreled howitzer) and the 45 mm 20K model 1932/38, a long-barreled, high-velocity gun useful against tanks, but less effective than the 76 mm gun against infantry.

In the rear of the turret, there was a rotating drum-type magazine for 18 45 mm shells or a radio station. The prototype underwent an extensive testing program in the summer and autumn of 1934. As a result of this testing, it was felt that a machine-gun was unnecessary on a tank with a 3-man crew, especially as it made the assembly of the turret more complicated.

Therefore, in early 1935, the tank went into production with a simpler design, incorporating the turret from the BT-5. (However, the idea of a wheeled/tracked vehicle with a 76 mm cannon was not abandoned and the plant was commissioned to develop a new BT-7 turret from the turret of the T-26-4.) In the production model, a cylindrical turret housed a 45 mm 20K gun with a DT machine gun. On some of the tanks, a model 71-TC radio with frame antenna was installed.

The crew consisted of three men: the commander (who also served as the gunner); the loader and the driver. In 1937, the company launched production of the BT-7 with a conical turret. The main armament remained the same, but the ammunition was increased to 44 rounds. All serving tanks now installed the DT machine gun in the rear niche. For the firing of the gun and coaxial machine gun at night, the tank was equipped with two special projector-type headlamps, and a mask placed on the gun. Subsequently, these lights were retrofitted to earlier models of the tank. Improvements were also made to the drive wheels, caterpillar tracks and gearbox by 1938.

In parallel with the main modification, 153 BT-7A artillery tanks were produced between 1936 and 1938. These were fitted with a larger turret and a 76 mm KT-type gun with 50 rounds of ammunition (40 in a tank with a portable radio).

In 1938, four experimental BT-8 tanks mounted with V-2 diesel engines were produced. After comparative tests of the BT-7 and BT-8, the diesel tanks were put into production in 1940 (under the designation BT-7M) with the powerplants being produced in a separate plant of the Voroshilovets factory to ensure supply. The diesel tanks were more fuel efficient, and the petrol-powered tanks were soon placed into reserve.

Several experimental tanks were conceived based on the BT series, for example the wheeled BT-IS, designed by N.F. Tsyganov, a platoon commander in the 4th Armoured Regiment of the Ukraine Military District and self-taught designer. The type successfully passed field tests, but was not ordered in bulk. Another Tsyganov design was the SV-2 "Cherepakha" (turtle, черепаха), with a new design of hull and turret. There was also the command tank KBT-7 with a fixed superstructure, the OT-7 mounting a flamethrower, the KhBT-7 designed to protect from toxic contamination and lay smokescreens, the SBT bridgelayer and the TTBT-7 and Thubten-7 radio-controlled tanks (known at the time as Teletanks). Finland converted 18 captured tanks into BT-42 assault guns.

Shortly before Operation Barbarossa (the German invasion of the Soviet Union), the BT-7 underwent an up-armor program. In 1940, Mariupol Ilyich Iron and Steel Works produced 50 sets of hinged homogeneous armor for the BT-7M, which increased the weight of the test tank to 18 tons. Unfortunately, nothing is known about the installation of these kits to military units.

Between 1935 and 1940, between 5753 BT-7 tanks of all modifications were built.

Combat experience 

In June 1941, at the outset of Barbarossa, the BT-7 was the main cavalry tank of the Soviet army. Tank losses were high, with over 2,000 BT-7 series tanks lost in the first 12 months on the Eastern Front. Hundreds more had been immobilized before the invasion by poor maintenance, and these had to be abandoned as the Soviet forces withdrew eastward. The BT-7 continued to be operated by the armored and mechanized forces of the Red Army for almost the entire war, but in greatly-decreased numbers after 1941.

By 1 November 1942, 32 BT-7 tanks were captured by Romanian forces. BT-7 series tanks continued in use by the Soviets in the Far East, against Japanese forces which lacked the heavy tanks of their German allies. BT-7 tanks were employed against Japanese forces in the Battles of Khalkhin Gol in 1939 and the Manchurian Strategic Offensive Operation in 1945.

Modern day 

As of early 2018, there is one known remaining BT-7 in operational order.

Organization and use 

The Table of Organization and Equipment for a typical Soviet light tank brigade in 1939 is as follows:
3 tank battalions, each containing
3 tank companies, each with 17 BT-7 or T-26 tanks;
1 signal platoon;
1 antitank platoon with 3 45 mm antitank guns;
1 antiaircraft machine gun (AA MG) platoon
1 reserve tank company, with 8 BT-7 or T-26 tanks;
1 signal company, with 5 T-37A tanks;
1 motorized infantry battalion, containing
3 motorized rifle companies;
1 signal platoon;
1 antitank platoon with 3 45 mm antitank guns;
1 AA MG platoon
1 additional AA MG platoon in brigade headquarters;
1 motor transport battalion;
1 reconnaissance battalion;
1 pioneer company;
1 medical company;
1 chemical company (flamethrowers).

References

Notes

Citations

External links

 BT-7 Tank at the Russian Battlefield
 BT-7 "test drive" (video)
 BT-7 at wwiivehicles.com (updated link)

Light tanks of the Soviet Union
Cavalry tanks
Interwar tanks of the Soviet Union
World War II tanks of the Soviet Union
Military vehicles introduced in the 1930s
Malyshev Factory products